Tarec Robert Saffiedine (born 6 September 1986) is a Belgian former professional mixed martial artist who competed in the Welterweight division of the Ultimate Fighting Championship. A professional MMA competitor since 2007, Saffiedine has also formerly competed for DREAM and Strikeforce, and was the last Strikeforce Welterweight Champion.

Background
Saffiedine was born to a Lebanese father, who emigrated to Belgium to study as an ophthalmologist, and a Belgian mother. His father was a Taekwondo practitioner, and since the age of ten Saffiedine has trained in Judo, Wing Chun and Taekwondo. Saffiedine grew up in Woluwe-Saint-Lambert in Brussels and also played basketball in his youth. Inspired by the Japanese comic book Tough, he finally took up Karate at age 16, and in 2005 received a black belt in Shihaishinkai, a style of knockdown karate that includes striking, throws and ground fighting. He also has an amateur kickboxing record of 12–1–1 and later began training in Brazilian Jiu-Jitsu and Muay Thai, and then Wrestling when he emigrated to the United States. Early in his career he worked a number of jobs including in a restaurant, a cinema, as a gardener, and a security guard. He received his nickname, "Sponge", from one of his coaches because he learns quickly. He is also known to switch stances frequently.

Mixed martial arts career

Early career
Saffiedine made his professional mixed martial arts debut in March 2007, beating his opponent Guillaume Janvier with a kimura submission. He went on to fight a further three times that year, all in promotions in his native Belgium and France. In January 2008, he relocated to the United States and began training with Team Quest. His first fight since his trans-Atlantic move came in June that year at Ultimate Cage Wars 12 in Canada, where he defeated his opponent Rich Bondoc with an armbar submission. In 2009, he had two fights in the United States and won both.

DREAM
From there, Saffiedine went to Japan to compete in DREAM. His first fight came against Seichi Ikemoto at DREAM 10: Welterweight Grand Prix 2009 Final. The bout was not part of the Welterweight Grand Prix, but was a reserve bout. Saffiedine went on to win a unanimous decision.

His next opponent under the promotion's banner was Yoon Dong-Sik, which took place at DREAM 12. He replaced former WEC Middleweight Champion Paulo Filho in the match on short notice, and lost by way of split decision. Saffiedine normally competes as a Welterweight (170 lbs.), but since he was replacing Filho, he fought as a Middleweight (185 lbs.).

Strikeforce
He then returned to the United States to compete at Strikeforce Challengers: Kaufman vs. Hashi, where he defeated James Terry by way of unanimous decision. He used effective striking to keep his opponent off balance, going as far as to open a cut under Terry's left eye that was bleeding profusely by early in the third round. Though his opponent, an experienced wrestler, did attempt some takedowns, Saffiedine shrugged off most of them or got to his feet quickly when the action did hit the mat. All three judges scored the fight 30–27 in favor of Saffiedine.

Saffiedine was next scheduled to face off against Nate Moore on 21 May 2010 at Strikeforce Challengers: Lindland vs. Casey. The opening round provided some back-and-forth action with Moore pushing forward with a wrestling attack, then responding well when Saffiedine began to take control with his strikes. That changed in the second, as Moore returned to his takedown-heavy strategy, but Saffiedine stood tall in the face of the attack and delivered powerful punches while remaining on his feet. A well placed punch by Saffiedine ended the fight by knockout at 1:21 of the second round – his first career knockout win.

He then faced grappler Brock Larson on 11 September 2010 at Shark Fights 13, on loan from Strikeforce. After a minute-long feeling-out period, Larson shot out of the gate with punches and was dropped by a side-stepping Saffiedine's first strike. From there, Saffiedine continued to outstrike Larson and was also able to defend against takedowns for all three rounds. All judges scored the fight 30–27 in favour of Saffiedine as he won via unanimous decision.

Saffiedine's next fight was against Tyron Woodley at Strikeforce Challengers: Woodley vs. Saffiedine. He and Woodley squared off in the main event.  He lost the fight via unanimous decision.

Saffiedine was supposed to face Evangelista Santos at Strikeforce: Feijao vs. Henderson but the fight was cancelled.

Saffiedine fought Scott Smith at Strikeforce: Fedor vs. Henderson. He was the replacement for Paul Daley, who was the original opponent for Saffiedine. He defeated Smith via unanimous decision.

Saffiedine fought Tyler Stinson to a split decision victory at Strikeforce: Rockhold vs. Jardine.

Saffiedine defeated Roger Bowling via unanimous decision at Strikeforce: Rousey vs. Kaufman.

In the last ever bout in Strikeforce history, Saffiedine utilized powerful leg kicks to win a 5-round unanimous decision against Nate Marquardt at Strikeforce: Marquardt vs. Saffiedine to become the final Strikeforce Welterweight Champion.

Ultimate Fighting Championship
It was announced shortly after the final Strikeforce event that Saffiedine would be amongst the promotion's former fighters brought over to the UFC.

Saffiedine was expected to face former EliteXC Middleweight Champion Robbie Lawler on 27 July 2013 at UFC on Fox 8.  However, Saffiedine was forced out of the bout with an injury and was replaced by Siyar Bahadurzada. Bahadurzada also suffered an injury and was then replaced by Bobby Voelker.

Saffiedine was expected to face Jake Ellenberger on 4 January 2014 at UFC Fight Night 34.  However, in late November, Ellenberger pulled out of the bout citing a hamstring injury and was replaced by Hyun Gyu Lim. Saffiedine won via unanimous decision. The win also earned Saffiedine his first Fight of the Night bonus award.

A fight with Jake Ellenberger was rebooked for UFC 172. However, Saffiedine had to pull out of the fight due to an undisclosed injury suffered in training.

Saffiedine faced Rory MacDonald on 4 October 2014 at UFC Fight Night: MacDonald vs. Saffiedine. After being out-struck the first two rounds, Saffiedine was finished for the first time in his career via TKO in the third round, as he was dropped by an uppercut and follow up punches leading to the stoppage.

A bout with Matt Brown was expected to take place on 14 February 2015 at UFC Fight Night 60.  However, it was announced on 1 January 2015 that Saffiedine had pulled out of the bout, citing a groin injury.

After an extended hiatus spent rehabbing a litany of injuries, Saffiedine returned to face Jake Ellenberger on 30 January 2016 at UFC on Fox 18. He won the fight by unanimous decision.

Saffiedine faced Rick Story on 29 May 2016 at UFC Fight Night 88. He lost the fight by unanimous decision.

A pairing with Matt Brown was rescheduled, and was expected to take place on 30 December 2016 at UFC 207. However, Brown was pulled from the fight on 11 November in favor of a matchup with Donald Cerrone three weeks earlier at UFC 206. Saffiedine instead faced Dong Hyun Kim. Kim was awarded a split decision victory.

Saffiedine faced Rafael dos Anjos on 17 June 2017 at UFC Fight Night: Holm vs. Correia. He lost the fight via unanimous decision.

On 26 November 2019, it was reported that Saffiedine was released by UFC.

Championships and accomplishments
Strikeforce
Strikeforce Welterweight Championship (One time, Last)
Fought the last fight in Strikeforce History
Ultimate Fighting Championship
Fight of the Night (One time)
Performance of the Night (One time)
MMAJunkie.com
2014 January Fight of the Month vs. Hyun Gyu Lim
2016 December Knockout of the Month vs. Dong Hyun Kim

Mixed martial arts record

|-
|Loss
|align=center|16–7
|Rafael dos Anjos
|Decision (unanimous)
|UFC Fight Night: Holm vs. Correia
|
|align=center|3
|align=center|5:00
|Kallang, Singapore
|
|-
|Loss
|align=center|16–6
|Dong Hyun Kim
|Decision (split)
|UFC 207
|
|align=center|3
|align=center |5:00
|Las Vegas, Nevada, United States
|
|-
|Loss
|align=center|16–5
|Rick Story
|Decision (unanimous)
|UFC Fight Night: Almeida vs. Garbrandt
|
|align=center|3
|align=center|5:00
|Las Vegas, Nevada, United States
|
|-
|Win
|align=center|16–4
|Jake Ellenberger
|Decision (unanimous)
|UFC on Fox: Johnson vs. Bader
|
|align=center|3
|align=center|5:00
|Newark, New Jersey, United States
|
|-
| Loss
| align=center| 15–4
| Rory MacDonald
| TKO (punches)
| UFC Fight Night: MacDonald vs. Saffiedine
| 
| align=center| 3
| align=center| 1:28
| Halifax, Nova Scotia, Canada
| 
|-
| Win
| align=center| 15–3
| Hyun Gyu Lim
| Decision (unanimous)
| UFC Fight Night: Saffiedine vs. Lim
| 
| align=center| 5
| align=center| 5:00
| Marina Bay, Singapore
| 
|-
| Win
| align=center| 14–3
| Nate Marquardt
| Decision (unanimous)
| Strikeforce: Marquardt vs. Saffiedine
| 
| align=center| 5
| align=center| 5:00
| Oklahoma City, Oklahoma, United States
| 
|-
| Win
| align=center| 13–3
| Roger Bowling
| Decision (unanimous)
| Strikeforce: Rousey vs. Kaufman
| 
| align=center| 3
| align=center| 5:00
| San Diego, California, United States
| 
|-
| Win
| align=center| 12–3
| Tyler Stinson
| Decision (split)
| Strikeforce: Rockhold vs. Jardine
| 
| align=center| 3
| align=center| 5:00
| Las Vegas, Nevada, United States
| 
|-
| Win
| align=center| 11–3
| Scott Smith
| Decision (unanimous)
| Strikeforce: Fedor vs. Henderson
| 
| align=center| 3
| align=center| 5:00
| Hoffman Estates, Illinois, United States
| 
|-
| Loss
| align=center| 10–3
| Tyron Woodley
| Decision (unanimous)
| Strikeforce Challengers: Woodley vs. Saffiedine
| 
| align=center| 3
| align=center| 5:00
| Nashville, Tennessee, United States
| 
|-
| Win
| align=center| 10–2
| Brock Larson
| Decision (unanimous)
| Shark Fights 13: Jardine vs Prangley
| 
| align=center| 3
| align=center| 5:00
| Amarillo, Texas, United States
| 
|-
| Win
| align=center| 9–2
| Nate Moore
| KO (punch)
| Strikeforce Challengers: Lindland vs. Casey
| 
| align=center| 2
| align=center| 1:21
| Portland, Oregon, United States
| 
|-
| Win
| align=center| 8–2
| James Terry
| Decision (unanimous)
| Strikeforce Challengers: Kaufman vs. Hashi
| 
| align=center| 3
| align=center| 5:00
| San Jose, California, United States
| 
|-
| Loss
| align=center| 7–2
| Yoon Dong-Sik
| Decision (split)
| DREAM 12
| 
| align=center| 3
| align=center| 5:00
| Osaka, Japan
| 
|-
| Win
| align=center| 7–1
| Seichi Ikemoto
| Decision (unanimous)
| DREAM 10
| 
| align=center| 2
| align=center| 5:00
| Saitama, Japan
| 
|-
| Win
| align=center| 6–1
| Mike Arellano
| Submission (americana)
| War Gods 5
| 
| align=center| 1
| align=center| 2:44
| Alpine, California, United States
| 
|-
| Win
| align=center| 5–1
| Scott Rose
| Submission (arm-triangle choke)
| Long Beach Fight Night 4
| 
| align=center| 1
| align=center| 0:58
| Long Beach, California, United States
| 
|-
| Win
| align=center| 4–1
| Rich Bondoc
| Submission (armbar)
| Ultimate Cage Wars 12
| 
| align=center| 1
| align=center| 2:18
| Winnipeg, Manitoba, Canada
| 
|-
| Win
| align=center| 3–1
| Raymond Jarman
| Decision (unanimous)
| Shooto Belgium: Encounter the Braves
| 
| align=center| 3
| align=center| 5:00
| Charleroi, Belgium
| 
|-
| Win
| align=center| 2–1
| Sebastian Grandin
| Submission (armbar)
| Xtreme Gladiators 3
| 
| align=center| 1
| align=center| 2:38
| Paris, France
| 
|-
| Loss
| align=center| 1–1
| Kamil Uygun
| Decision (unanimous)
| Night of the Gladiators
| 
| align=center| 2
| align=center| 5:00
| Brakel, Belgium
| 
|-
| Win
| align=center| 1–0
| Guillaume Janvier
| Submission (kimura)
| Shooto Belgium: Consecration
| 
| align=center| 1
| align=center| 1:15
| Charleroi, Belgium
|

See also
 List of current UFC fighters
 List of Strikeforce alumni
 List of male mixed martial artists

References

External links
 
 

1986 births
Living people
Sportspeople from Brussels
Belgian male mixed martial artists
Welterweight mixed martial artists
Belgian practitioners of Brazilian jiu-jitsu
People awarded a black belt in Brazilian jiu-jitsu
Belgian male karateka
Belgian male taekwondo practitioners
Belgian Wing Chun practitioners
Mixed martial artists utilizing karate
Mixed martial artists utilizing Muay Thai
Mixed martial artists utilizing taekwondo
Mixed martial artists utilizing judo
Mixed martial artists utilizing Wing Chun
Mixed martial artists utilizing Brazilian jiu-jitsu
Belgian Muay Thai practitioners
Belgian people of Lebanese descent
Sportspeople of Lebanese descent
Belgian expatriates in the United States
Sportspeople from Temecula, California
Strikeforce (mixed martial arts) champions
Ultimate Fighting Championship male fighters
21st-century Belgian people